The Japanese hare (Lepus brachyurus) is a species of hare endemic to Japan. In Japanese, it is called the Nousagi (Japanese: 野兎), meaning "field rabbit".

Taxonomy
Coenraad Jacob Temminck described the Japanese hare in 1845. The specific epithet (brachyurus) is derived from the Ancient Greek brachys meaning "short" and oura meaning "tail".

The four subspecies of this hare are:
L. b. angustidens
L. b. brachyurus
L. b. lyoni
L. b. okiensis

Description
In areas of northern Japan, the west coast, and the island of Sado, where snowfall is heavy, the Japanese hare loses its coloration in the autumn, remaining white until the spring, when the reddish-brown fur returns.

Habitat
The Japanese hare is found across Honshu, Shikoku, and Kyushu, that is, all the main islands of Japan except Hokkaido, where it is replaced by the related mountain hare (Lepus timidus). It occurs up to an altitude of 2700 m. It is mostly found in mountains or hilly areas. It also inhabits forests or brushy areas. Due to human encroachment, the Japanese hare has been able to adapt to and thrive in and around urban environments, so much so that it has become a nuisance in some places.

Reproduction
The litter size of the Japanese hare varies from 1 to 6. The age of maturity is uncertain, but females probably breed within a year of birth. Breeding continues year round. Several litters are born each year, each of which contain 2–4 individuals. Mating is promiscuous; males chase females, and box to repel rivals.

Behavior
The Japanese hare, like most hares and rabbits, is crepuscular (feeds mainly in the evening and early morning). It is silent except when it is in distress, and gives out a call for the distress. It can occupy burrows sometimes. It is a solitary animal except during mating season, when males and females gather for breeding.

Food
Vegetation found in and around its habitat is where the Japanese hare gets most of its nutrients. Grasses, shrubs, and bushes are all eaten by the hare. The Japanese hare is one of the few hares that will eat the bark off of trees and it does so occasionally which can cause major damage to trees and forests.
They will sometimes eat the bark from a bonsai tree in Asia.

Conservation
The Japanese hare population seems to be stable, though the quality or/and size of their habitat is decreasing. On a local level, they are used in hunting and specimen collecting. They are threatened by the creation of urban and industrial areas, water management systems, such as dams, hunting, trapping and invasive and non-native diseases and species. It is not known if they occur in any protected areas.

Human interaction
In some places, it has become a nuisance animal.  It is hunted in certain regions for food, fur, pelts, and to help curb its growing numbers.

The mythic Hare of Inaba has a place in the mythology of Japan as an essential part of the legend of the Shinto god Ōkuninushi.

References

Lepus
Endemic mammals of Japan
Mammals described in 1845